Siddarth Kaul (born 19 May 1990), also spelled Siddharth Kaul, is an Indian professional cricketer. A fast bowler who bowls at about 130 km/h, he made his first-class debut for Punjab in 2007. Kaul was a part of the victorious India Under-19s team at the 2008 Under-19 Cricket World Cup and was named as one of the players to be drafted for the Indian Premier League, where he signed for the Kolkata Knight Riders. His father, Tej Kaul, played across three seasons in the 1970s for Jammu and Kashmir.

Domestic career
After a successful tournament at the Under 19 world cup in Malaysia, he started his domestic career for his home state of Punjab. A host of injuries derailed his smooth run and he was more out than in at the first-class level until 2012. However, then came the revival and Kaul has managed to spearhead the Punjab bowling line-up since then.

Kaul made his debut for the Punjab cricket team against Orissa in the 2007-08 Ranji Trophy, alongside his brother who was wicket-keeper for the match. He took a five wicket haul in the first innings, and finished with figures of 5/97. He has also made appearances for the Punjab youth teams, at Under-15, Under-17 and Under-19 levels.

He was the leading wicket-taker for Punjab in the 2018–19 Vijay Hazare Trophy, with twelve dismissals in five matches. In October 2018, he was named in India A's squad for the 2018–19 Deodhar Trophy. In October 2019, he was named in India A's squad for the 2019–20 Deodhar Trophy.

Indian Premier League
For the Indian Premier League's inaugural season, a number of members of the victorious India Under-19s team from the 2008 Under-19 Cricket World Cup and other specified youngsters were named as players to be drafted by teams in the Indian Premier League, whilst other youth players would have to be chosen to play for their local teams. Kaul was chosen by the Kolkata Knight Riders, based in Kolkata, West Bengal, and captained by Sourav Ganguly.

Sunrisers Hyderabad bid for him in the 2016 season, but he was benched for that season. 2017 saw the skiddy pacer shooting into limelight for his 16 wickets in 10 games playing for SRH. He bowled some crucial overs for the David Warner led team and was an ideal foil to Bhuvneshwar Kumar. In January 2018, he was bought by the Sunrisers Hyderabad in the 2018 IPL auction. He also had a successful 2018 season being a crucial cog in the bowling Attack of SRH that took them to their 2nd finals. In February 2022, he was bought by the Royal Challengers Bangalore in the auction for the 2022 Indian Premier League tournament.

Under-19 career
Kaul was named in the squad for the India U-19s team for the 2008 Under-19 World Cup in Malaysia. He played in all of India's matches as they proceeded to the final, where they defeated the South African U-19 cricket team by 12 runs (adjusted by the DL method). Siddarth was entrusted with the task of bowling the final over by his then skipper Virat Kohli against South Africa in Malaysia, where India won the under-19 World Cup for the second time. The skiddy pacer ended with 10 wickets from 5 games and jointly led the Indian bowling charts alongside Ravindra Jadeja, who was the vice-captain of that side. His 10 wickets came at an average of 15.40, placing him as the joint tenth on the list of highest wicket-takers for the tournament. Kaul was bought by the Royal Challengers Bangalore for the Tata IPL 2022

A Team career
Kaul was part of India A cricket team for South Africa A Team Triangular Series in 2013 and 2017 South Africa A Team Tri-Series.

International career
In November 2017, Kaul was named in India's One Day International (ODI) squad for their series against Sri Lanka, but he did not play. In May 2018, he was once again named in India's ODI squad, this time for the series against England, and the Twenty20 International (T20I) matches against England and Ireland. He made his Twenty20 International (T20I) debut for India against Ireland on 29 June 2018. He made his One Day International (ODI) debut for India against England on 12 July 2018.

References

External links

1990 births
Living people
Indian cricketers
India One Day International cricketers
India Twenty20 International cricketers
People from Kangra, Himachal Pradesh
Punjab, India cricketers
Sunrisers Hyderabad cricketers
Kolkata Knight Riders cricketers
Delhi Capitals cricketers
North Zone cricketers
India Green cricketers
Indian A cricketers